Parkinson's is a long-term degenerative disorder of the central nervous system that mainly affects the motor system.

Parkinson's or Parkinsons may also refer to:
 Parkinsonism, a clinical syndrome
 The Parkinsons, architects
 The Parkinsons (band), Portuguese punk rock band

See also
Parkinson (disambiguation)